Rostyslav Lyubomyrovych Derzhypilsky (born October 7, 1975, Kosiv, Ivano-Frankivsk Oblast) is a Ukrainian theater director and actor, People's Artist of Ukraine, and the artistic director of the Ivano-Frankivsk Academic Regional Music and Drama Theater named after Ivan Franko.

Productions 

 Theatrical Singing at the Observatory" 2014.
 “Oscar and the Lady in Pink” 2015 
 Hamlet, 2017 
 Romeo and Juliet, 2021 
 “Sweet Darussa” 2021 
 ‘Vyshyvany. King of Ukraine’ 2021

Honors
2007 - Honored Artist of Ukraine
2009 - Laureate of the Volodymyr Blavatsky National Union of Theater Actors of Ukraine Award (USA-Ukraine)
2009 - Medal "For Merits to Prykarpattia" of Ivano-Frankivsk Regional State Administration and Ivano-Frankivsk Regional Council
2013 - Laureate of the Vitaliy Smolyak Prize in the field of theatrical art
2015 - Diploma of the Cabinet of Ministers of Ukraine
2015 - People's Artist of Ukraine
2019 - Laureate of the Shevchenko Prize in the nomination "Theatrical Art" - for performances of "Aeneid" by I. Kotlyarevsky, "She is the Earth" by V. Stefanyk, "HAMLET" by V. Shakespeare, "Oscar and the Lady in Pink" by E.E. Schmitt, Ivano-Frankivsk National Academic Drama Theater named after Ivan Franko
2020 - Order of Merit III degree

References 

1975 births
University of Lviv alumni
Lviv Conservatory alumni
Recipients of the title of Merited Artist of Ukraine
Recipients of the title of People's Artists of Ukraine
Recipients of the Order of Merit (Ukraine), 3rd class
Living people